William John White (October 7, 1850 – February 16, 1923) was an American businessman and politician who served one term as a U.S. Representative from Ohio from 1893 to 1895.

Early life and career 
Born at Rice Lake, Ontario, Canada, White moved to the United States in 1857 with his parents, who settled in Cleveland, Ohio. He attended the district schools. He entered business as a candy maker in 1869, and later began the manufacture of chewing gum. He served as mayor of West Cleveland in 1889.

His wife, Ellen Maria Mansfield, was born in Cleveland, Ohio, and was the daughter of Orange and Marietta Mansfield. They had several children. and were later divorced.

Congress 
White was elected as a Republican to the Fifty-third Congress (March 4, 1893 – March 3, 1895). He declined to be a candidate for renomination in 1894.

Later career and death 
He was first president of the American Chicle Co. and later president of the W. J. White Chicle Co. He died in Cleveland on February 16, 1923. White was interred in Lake View Cemetery.

References

Sources

1850 births
1923 deaths
Politicians from Cleveland
Burials at Lake View Cemetery, Cleveland
Mayors of places in Ohio
People from Red Lake, Ontario
Pre-Confederation Canadian emigrants to the United States
Republican Party members of the United States House of Representatives from Ohio